Gerardo Manuel de Leon Roxas Sr. (August 25, 1923 – April 19, 1982), better known as Gerardo M. Roxas or simply Gerry Roxas, was one of two children of former Philippine President Manuel Roxas.  He was the father of Gerardo "Dinggoy" A. Roxas, Jr. and former Department of the Interior and Local Government (DILG) Secretary Manuel "Mar" A. Roxas II.

As a representative of the 1st District of Capiz and, later, as a Senator of the Republic of the Philippines (1963 to 1972), Gerry Roxas sponsored legislation that benefited the masses, improved living conditions, provided employment and family income and in general, promoted equitable sharing in the  wealth of the nation. He also wrote many bills of national importance and was consistently voted by the Philippines Free Press and other national publications as one of the outstanding Senators of the Philippines.

Life and political career

Gerardo Manuel de Leon Roxas, also known as Gerry, was born on August 25, 1923 in Manila to Manuel Acuña Roxas, who was then the House Speaker and 1st district representative of Capiz, and Trinidad De Leon. Gerry was 21 when his father was elected President of the Philippines and was 24 when his father died due to heart attack.

He finished elementary school at the De La Salle College and high school at the Ateneo de Manila. He studied law at the University of the Philippines College of Law and graduated in 1949. There, he was a member of the Upsilon Sigma Phi fraternity. The following year, he was admitted to the Philippine Bar. In 1955, Gerry Roxas married Judy, the daughter of J. Amado and Ester Araneta, with whom he had three children: Maria Lourdes, Manuel II, and Gerardo Jr.

In 1957, he was elected Congressman of the 1st District of Capiz and won with an overwhelming majority. As a young congressman, Gerry Roxas established the Roxas Educational Advancement Committee in 1958. The organization provided scholarship grants to youths in Capiz province. The program later expanded to the nationwide Gerry Roxas Leadership Awards (1967) to motivate and develop the youth's potentials in leadership and service to country. This nationwide program continues to this day. He was re-elected in 1961.

Roxas led the Liberal Party senatorial slate in 1963 and, after an exciting contest, emerged the top-notcher, obtaining the highest number of votes cast for a national candidate. In 1965, he ran for vice president as the running mate of then-President Diosdado Macapagal. In the unfinished counting of the abruptly stopped Comelec tabulation, he lost by merely 26,724 votes, the narrowest margin ever recorded in our country's vice presidential elections, to Fernando Lopez. He ran for re-election in the 1969 senatorial elections and emerged as the sole survivor of the entire Liberal Party senatorial slate. He was named as the Senate Minority Leader in 1970. Roxas was among the injured during the Plaza Miranda bombing that occurred during the party's political rally in 1971.

Martial law years
Gerry Roxas served as Philippine Senator until September 1972, when Martial Law was declared by then-President and dictator Ferdinand Marcos. At that time, he was President of the Liberal Party and was also co-Chairman of the United Nationalist Democratic Organization (UNIDO), a multi-sector network which galvanized societal opposition to Martial Law.

Death
Roxas died on April 19, 1982 at the age of 58 at Lenox Hill Hospital in New York City due to complications from a liver tumor.

Gerry Roxas Foundation
His legacy continues to this day through the institution that bears his name – the Gerry Roxas Foundation. The foundation implements programs towards local governance development, barangay justice and peace, health services, youth leadership and  development finance.  The foundation is headed by his widow, Judy Araneta Roxas, with his son, Mar Roxas's assistance as an honorary member of the board of trustees.

Quotations

References

External links
The Gerry Roxas Foundation

1924 births
1982 deaths
Minority leaders of the Senate of the Philippines
Senators of the 7th Congress of the Philippines
Senators of the 6th Congress of the Philippines
Members of the House of Representatives of the Philippines from Capiz
University of the Philippines alumni
Roxas, Gerry
Gerardo
Araneta family
Filipino people of Spanish descent
Children of presidents of the Philippines
Liberal Party (Philippines) politicians
Burials at the Manila North Cemetery
Candidates in the 1965 Philippine vice-presidential election
Presidents of the Liberal Party of the Philippines
Visayan people
Deaths from cancer in New York (state)